Buford is an unincorporated community in Williams County, North Dakota, United States. It is the nearest community to the Fort Union Trading Post National Historic Site. It is named for the nearby historic Fort Buford at the confluence of the Missouri and Yellowstone Rivers.

Notes

Unincorporated communities in Williams County, North Dakota
Unincorporated communities in North Dakota